Shin Ha-young is a South Korean actress and model. She is known for her drama roles in Doctor Prisoner, Chocolate and Soul Mechanic.

Biography and career
She was born on August 11, 1993 in South Korea. She attended Ewha Womans University to study acting. After she graduated from Ewha Womans University, she joined Bicester's Entertainment, she first did modeling for various promotional videos of motor vehicles and commercials of skincare products. In 2019 she made her acting debut in drama Doctor Prisoner. She then appeared in drama Chocolate. In 2020 she appeared in drama Soul Mechanic and the very same year she appeared in drama Love Is Annoying, but I Hate Being Lonely! as Jeon Bo-ra.

Filmography

Television series

References

External links
 
 

1993 births
Living people
21st-century South Korean actresses
South Korean female models
South Korean television actresses